Gebhard XXV. von Alvensleben (born December 1618, baptized January 6, 1619 at Beeskow - October 1, 1681 in Neugattersleben) was Magdeburg Privy Councilor, aristocrat and historian. In 1649, after the Thirty Years War, he became a councillor of Duke Augustus, Administrator of the Archbishopric of Magdeburg.

References

1618 births
1681 deaths
Brandenburgian nobility
17th-century German historians